The Abbey of St Paul, Verdun, is a former Premonstratensian monastery in Verdun, department of Meuse, Grand Est region, France. The surviving buildings are used for civic purposes.

The abbey was founded in 973 by Benedictine monks. In 1135 it passed to the Premonstratensians, then not long established. The abbey was destroyed and rebuilt several times, most recently in the 17th century. In 1790, during the French Revolution, a new church was being built. Both that and the existing 17th-century church were destroyed. The 17th-century conventual buildings survived, and now accommodate the palais de justice of Verdun and the offices of the sous-préfecture of the Meuse.

The former abbey was noted as a monument historique on 2 December 1926 and part of the interiors on 23 November 1946.

References

Further reading
 Philippe Bonnet, Les Constructions de l'Ordre de Prémontré en France aux XVIIe et XVIIIe siècles. Paris, Arts et métiers graphiques, coll. "Bibliothèque de la Société française d'archéologie" (no 15), 1983
 Bernard Ardura (preface by René Taveneaux), Abbayes, prieurés et monastères de l'ordre de Prémontré en France des origines à nos jours: dictionnaire historique et bibliographique. Nancy, Presses universitaires de Nancy, 1993

Premonstratensian monasteries in France
Buildings and structures in Meuse (department)